Chiloglanis neumanni, Neumann's suckermouth, is a species of upside-down catfish native to Central Africa.  This species grows to a length of  SL.

References

External links 

neumanni
Catfish of Africa
Freshwater fish of Angola
Fish of Malawi
Fish of Mozambique
Freshwater fish of Namibia
Fish of Zambia
Fish of Zimbabwe
Fish of Tanzania
Taxa named by George Albert Boulenger
Fish described in 1911